Pius Ngugi Mbugua, is a Kenyan entrepreneur and one of the country's wealthiest persons.

Early life
Ngugi was born in Kiambu County. on 8 March 1944. He is married to Josephine Wambui Ngugi and Esther M Passaris, together they have four children; Angeline, Mbugua, Louise, Makenna and Miki.

Business
Ngugi owns Thika Coffee Mills and the Kenya Nut Company. He is a shareholder in Kenya Alliance Insurance. His other interests include sweet manufacturing, dairy farming, winery and Amazon Motors.

Thika Coffee Mills
Thika Coffee Mills is a major private coffee miller in Kenya.

Kenya Nut Company
Kenya Nut Company was founded in 1974 and has 2,500 employees. It is a major player in the global macadamia nuts market. In 2006, Kenya earned Kshs 2.3 billion (equivalent to US$33 million then) from macadamia nut exports. Kenya Nut Company is the main exporter of macadamia nuts from Kenya.

Tatu City
Ngugi is a shareholder in the Tatu City project where partners include Renaissance Capital co-founder and millionaire Stephen Jennings. Tatu City, a 2,500 acre (1,000 ha) live-work-play development 18 kilometers outside central Nairobi, is expected to be one of the largest real estate projects in Kenya's history and home to 100,000 residents.

References

External links
 Kenya Nut Company
 Thika Coffee Mills
 Tatu City

Year of birth missing (living people)
Living people
People from Kiambu County
Kenyan businesspeople